Lee Kyung-Keun (born November 7, 1962) is a retired South Korean judoka.

He was a runner-up in the half-lightweight (65 kg) division at the 1985 World Judo Championships.

Three years later, at the Summer Olympics 1988 in Seoul, Lee won an Olympic gold medal in the half-lightweight (65 kg) division.

External links
Database Olympics

Judoka at the 1988 Summer Olympics
Olympic judoka of South Korea
Olympic gold medalists for South Korea
1962 births
Living people
Olympic medalists in judo
Asian Games medalists in judo
Judoka at the 1986 Asian Games
South Korean male judoka
Medalists at the 1988 Summer Olympics
Asian Games gold medalists for South Korea

Medalists at the 1986 Asian Games
20th-century South Korean people